Juan Manuel Asensi Ripoll (born 23 September 1949) is a Spanish retired footballer who played as an attacking midfielder.

Club career
Born in Alicante, Valencian Community, Asensi began his career at local Elche CF – at the time in La Liga – before joining FC Barcelona in 1970, for 80 million pesetas. During his time at the club, he was instrumental in helping the Catalans win the league in 1974 (34 matches, 11 goals, third-best in squad), also adding the UEFA Cup Winners' Cup in 1979 and scoring in the final held in Basel.

After only ten matches in the 1980–81 season, but 484 competitive appearances with 124 goals, 32-year-old Asensi moved to Mexico where he would play until his retirement in 1983. He had two brief spells at coaching, with Barcelona's youth sides and lowly Orihuela CF.

International career
Asensi represented Spain 41 times, scoring seven goals. His debut came on 23 February 1969 in a 1–2 loss against Belgium for the 1970 FIFA World Cup qualification, as the country did not make it to the final stages.

Asensi was picked for the squads at the 1978 World Cup and UEFA Euro 1980 – his last international was played in the latter competition, also against Belgium (and also 1–2 defeat) – and also competed at the 1968 Summer Olympics.

International goals

Post-retirement
In 1984, Asensi co-founded the TARR football school in Barcelona with fellow ex-players Carles Rexach, Joaquim Rifé and Antoni Torres.

Honours
Barcelona
La Liga: 1973–74
Copa del Rey: 1970–71, 1977–78, 1980–81
UEFA Cup Winners' Cup: 1978–79
Inter-Cities Fairs Cup: 1971 Trophy Play-Off

References

External links

FC Barcelona profile

1949 births
Living people
Footballers from Alicante
Spanish footballers
Association football midfielders
La Liga players
Elche CF Ilicitano footballers
Elche CF players
FC Barcelona players
Liga MX players
Club Puebla players
C.F. Oaxtepec footballers
Spain youth international footballers
Spain under-23 international footballers
Spain amateur international footballers
Spain international footballers
1978 FIFA World Cup players
UEFA Euro 1980 players
Olympic footballers of Spain
Footballers at the 1968 Summer Olympics
Spanish expatriate footballers
Expatriate footballers in Mexico
Spanish expatriate sportspeople in Mexico
Spanish football managers
Segunda División B managers